Alexis Gougeard (born 5 March 1993 in Rouen) is a French cyclist, who currently rides for French amateur team VC Rouen 76.

He specializes in time trials and track cycling. He became professional in 2014, as a member of the  team. He was named in the start list for the 2015 Vuelta a España, where he took his first grand tour stage win on the nineteenth stage, making a winning attack from a breakaway group.

Major results

2011
 1st  Time trial, National Junior Road Championships
 1st  Overall Grand Prix Rüebliland
1st Stage 1
 2nd  Time trial, UEC European Junior Road Championships
 2nd Paris–Roubaix Juniors
2012
 2nd Road race, National Under-23 Road Championships
 3rd Overall Kreiz Breizh Elites
2013
 1st Prologue Tour de l'Avenir
 2nd Overall Coupe des nations Ville Saguenay
1st Stage 1
 3rd Time trial, National Under-23 Road Championships
 5th Time trial, Mediterranean Games
 7th Time trial, UEC European Under-23 Road Championships
 10th ZLM Tour
2014
 1st Classic Loire Atlantique
 1st Boucles de l'Aulne
2015
 1st  Overall Tour de l'Eurométropole
1st  Young rider classification
1st Prologue
 Vuelta a España
1st Stage 19
 Combativity award Stage 19
 1st Classic Loire Atlantique
 1st Stage 3 Four Days of Dunkirk
 4th Overall Étoile de Bessèges
1st  Young rider classification
 5th Overall Driedaagse van West-Vlaanderen
2016
 5th Omloop Het Nieuwsblad
2017
 1st Polynormande
 1st  Mountains classification, Tour de Wallonie
 5th Time trial, National Road Championships
2018
 4th Overall Four Days of Dunkirk
 7th Overall Étoile de Bessèges
2019
 1st  Overall Circuit de la Sarthe
1st Stage 3
 1st Boucles de l'Aulne
 6th Overall Tour Poitou-Charentes en Nouvelle-Aquitaine
  Combativity award Stage 16 Tour de France
2020
 5th Overall Tour Poitou-Charentes en Nouvelle-Aquitaine
2021
 9th Polynormande
2023
 1st Grand Prix de Buxerolles

Grand Tour general classification results timeline

References

External links

 
 
 
 

1993 births
Living people
French male cyclists
French Vuelta a España stage winners
Sportspeople from Rouen
European Games competitors for France
Cyclists at the 2015 European Games
Competitors at the 2013 Mediterranean Games
Mediterranean Games competitors for France
Cyclists from Normandy
21st-century French people